Kecskeméti Labdarúgó Club is a professional football club based in Kecskemét, Bács-Kiskun County, Hungary, that competes in the Bács-Kiskun county league.

Name changes
1992–2017: Kecskeméti Labdarúgó Club
2017–2018: Kecskeméti Labdarúgó Club KTE SI
2018: Kecskeméti TE
2018: Kecskeméti Labdarúgó Club

External links
 Profile on Magyar Futball

References

Football clubs in Hungary
Association football clubs established in 1992
1992 establishments in Hungary
Megyei Bajnokság I